Takoradi Football Club is also known F.C. Takoradi is a Ghanaian professional association football club based in Sekondi-Takoradi, Ghana. They are a currently playing in Division Two League.

History
The team was founded in 2009 by Kim Grant a former Ghana Black stars member and professional  player.

Kim Grant is also the grandson of George Alfred Grant also popularly called Paa Grant, was born at Beyin in Western Nzema, on August 15, 1878.

Management

Club Honours

Technical staff

Squad

Out on loan

Former players
1. Players that have played/managed in the Ghana League or any foreign equivalent to this level (i.e. fully professional league).
2. Players with full international caps.
3. Players that hold a club record.

Club badge and colours 
Takoradi Football Club home colors are Red, White, and Green. Traditional away kit colors have been either White with red and black strips; however, in recent years several different colors have been used. The origins of the club's home colors are based on the countries flag.

Takoradi Football Club has only worn one badge on their shirts since being established in 2009, but the club has revamped its badge for 2017.

Kit manufacturers and shirt sponsors 
Takoradi Football Club does not currently have official shirts sponsors. Their kits have been supplied by Italian sports brand Legea since 2009 through technical sponsorship.

References

External links
 Takoradi Football Club – Official website
 - 1.FC Slovácko
 - 1.SC Znojmo

Football clubs in Ghana
Association football clubs established in 2009
2009 establishments in Ghana
Sekondi-Takoradi